How to Clean a Couple o' Things is a 7" EP released by Propagandhi alongside their debut album, How to Clean Everything.  The artwork consisted of photos and text stuck over the NOFX release The P.M.R.C. Can Suck on This! NOFX later used the already-layered artwork for their Fuck the Kids EP, and added a few more things to it.

Track listing
 "Pigs Will Pay"
 "Stick the Fucking Flag Up Your Ass, You Skinhead Creep"

References

1993 EPs
Propagandhi albums
Fat Wreck Chords EPs